The UCLA Bruins men's soccer team is an intercollegiate varsity sports team of the University of California at Los Angeles. The team is a member of the Pac-12 Conference of the National Collegiate Athletic Association.

Current roster

Stadium 
 
From 1969 until 2017 the Bruins played at Frank Marshall Field of Drake Stadium on campus. The stadium is named in honor of Elvin C. "Ducky" Drake, UCLA's long time trainer and former student athlete. Film producer Marshall graduated from UCLA.

In 2018, the program moved into the soccer-specific stadium, Wallis Annenberg Stadium, along with the UCLA Bruins women's soccer program.

Admissions bribery scandal
On March 12, 2019, head coach Jorge Salcedo was arrested, and indicted by a federal grand jury in Boston for conspiracy to commit racketeering for alleged participation in the 2019 college admissions bribery scandal. His indictment charged Salcedo with taking $200,000 in bribes to help two students, one in 2016 and one in 2018, get admitted to UCLA using falsified soccer credential admission information. As a result, he was placed on leave by UCLA from his coaching position at the school. On March 21, 2019, it was announced that he had resigned.

Rivalries 
UCLA soccer's main rivals are Stanford, UC Santa Barbara, and California.

Seasons 

Source: UCLA Athletics

Notable alumni 
This list of former players includes those who received international caps, made significant contributions to the team in terms of appearances or goals, or who made significant contributions to the sport after they left. It is clearly not yet complete and all inclusive, and additions and refinements will continue to be made over time.

Postseason 

The UCLA Bruins have an NCAA Division I Tournament record of 74–41 through forty-five appearances.

References

External links 

 

 
1937 establishments in California